The 1832 United States presidential election in Alabama took place between November 2 and December 5, 1832, as part of the 1832 United States presidential election. Voters chose seven representatives, or electors, to the Electoral College, who voted for president and vice president.

Alabama voted for the Democratic candidate, Andrew Jackson, over the National Republican candidate, Henry Clay. Jackson won Alabama by a margin of 99.94%.

Results

See also
United States presidential elections in Alabama

References

Alabama
1832
1832 Alabama elections